The 2019–20 Primera Nacional de Fútbol was the 19th edition of this league and the first season as the Spanish women's football third-tier league.

On 6 May 2020, the Royal Spanish Football Federation announced the premature end of the league, revoking relegations and planning a new format for the promotion playoffs, to be played if possible by the seven group leaders and the best second qualified team.

Format
Teams were confirmed on 31 July 2019. Three days after the confirmation, Atlántida Matamá, that previously resigned to promotion to Segunda División Pro, withdrew from the competition.

The seven first-placed teams and the runner-up with the most points will qualify for the promotion playoffs. The four winners of the four ties, decided by the luck of the draw, will be promoted to Segunda División Pro for the next season.

Group 1

Group 2

Group 3

Group 4

Group 5

Group 6

Group 7

Ranking of second-placed teams

Promotion playoffs
Initially planned as a double-legged playoff, after the suspension due to the COVID-19 pandemic, the Federation changed the system to a single-legged format to be played if possible on 25 and 26 July.

|}

References

External links

Spa
3
Women3
Primera Nacional de Fútbol (women) seasons
Spain